Interlude is the seventh studio album by Jamie Cullum. It was released on 6 October 2014 in the UK and 27 January 2015 in the US through Island Records, a division of Universal Music. The album was produced, engineered and mixed by Benedic Lamdin for Nostalgia 77.

The album is composed entirely of cover versions of other artists work including songs written by Ray Charles, Randy Newman, Sufjan Stevens and Dizzy Gillespie. Featured performers on the album include Gregory Porter ("Don't Let Me Be Misunderstood") and Laura Mvula ("Good Morning Heartache").

Reception

The album has received generally favourable reviews from critics. The Daily Telegraph included the album on its list of The 33 best jazz albums of 2014 where music critic Helen Brown rated the album four-out-of-five stars and claims: "This record finally captures the warmth, passion and spontaneity of Cullum's live gigs." In his review for AllMusic, Stephen Thomas Erlewine gives the album four-out-of-five stars and notes "Cullum seems reinvigorated. He's enjoying tearing into these old tunes and that excitement isn't merely palpable, it's contagious."

Track listing 

The deluxe edition of the album includes a DVD of Cullum's 17-song live performance filmed at the 2014 Jazz à Vienne Festival

Charts

References

2014 albums
Jamie Cullum albums
Island Records albums